Raymond Shulman (born 8 December 1949) is a Scottish musician, and the youngest of three brothers in progressive rock band Gentle Giant.

Shulman was born in Portsmouth. His father was a trumpet player in a jazz band, and that was the first instrument he learned to play. He went on to learn violin and guitar and was primed for the National Youth Orchestra of Great Britain, but his brother Derek convinced him to join his band Simon Dupree and the Big Sound, which later evolved into Gentle Giant.

During Shulman's recording days in the band as a bass guitarist, his virtuosity often compared to popular players such as Yes's Chris Squire. Shulman was quite adept at other instruments as well, sometimes doubling on violin, recorder, trumpet, acoustic and electric guitars. Shulman and keyboardist-bandmate Kerry Minnear composed or co-wrote much of the music for Gentle Giant.

Shulman was in Gentle Giant from the beginning in 1970 to the last tour in 1980. He went on to become a record producer in the late 1980s and 1990s, working with the Sugarcubes, the Sundays, the Trash Can Sinatras, and Ian McCulloch, The Defects among others. He also has created music for several video games, such as Privateer 2 and Azrael's Tear and released two trance-EPs under pseudonym Head-Doctor.

References

1949 births
Living people
Male bass guitarists
Scottish bass guitarists
British rock violists
Progressive rock musicians
Simon Dupree and the Big Sound members
20th-century bass guitarists
Progressive rock bass guitarists
21st-century British guitarists
Gentle Giant members
20th-century British male musicians
21st-century British male musicians
20th-century violists
21st-century violists